Gordon B. Agnew is a Canadian engineering professor at the University of Waterloo. Agnew's primary research interests are in the fields of encryption and data security.

Education 
Agnew earned his degree in electrical engineering from the University of Waterloo in 1978 and a Ph.D. in 1982.

Career 
After earning his PhD, Agnew joined the electrical and computer engineering department of University of Waterloo. Agnew also co-founded Certicom, which was later acquired by BlackBerry Limited. Agnew joined Peer Ledger as Co-CEO in 2019. 

Agnew is a Foundation Fellow of the Institute of Combinatorics and its Applications and is a Fellow of the Canadian Academy of Engineering.

See also
 List of University of Waterloo people

References

External links
Faculty information

Canadian computer scientists
University of Waterloo alumni
Academic staff of the University of Waterloo
Living people
Year of birth missing (living people)
Fellows of the Canadian Academy of Engineering